All Night is an American teen comedy streaming television series created by Jason Ubaldi that premiered on May 11, 2018, on Hulu. The series stars a large ensemble of actors including Chris Avila, Brec Bassinger, Chanel Celaya, Ty Doran, Teala Dunn, Allie Grant, Caleb Ray Gallegos, and Eva Gutowski. The series is executive produced by Ubaldi, Brian Dannelly, Shelley Zimmerman, Jordan Levin, Brett Bouttier, and Joe Davola.

Premise
All Night takes place on "an overnight, lock-in graduation party in which a group of new grads will do whatever it takes to make their remaining high school dreams come true. A night filled with sex, drugs, and other illegal paraphernalia."

Cast and characters

Main

 Chris Avila as Stymie
 Brec Bassinger as Veronica "Roni" Sweetzer
 Chanel Celaya as Stefania
 Ty Doran as Bryce
 Teala Dunn as Alexis
 Caleb Ray Gallegos as Jonas
 Allie Grant as Melinda Weems
 Eva Gutowski as Lyssee Haversham
 Tetona Jackson as Cassie Fullner
 Tom Maden as Nino Clemente
 Jenn McAllister as Deanna Hoffman
 Austin North as Oz
 Tequan Richmond as Christian Fullner
 Chester Rushing as Cody
 Jake Short as Fig Figueroa

Recurring

 Kate Flannery as Principal Saperstein
 Chance Sutton as Drunk Bernie
 Dawan Owens as Coach Lewis
 Gus Kamp as Gerald Gene Bottom Jr.
 Noureen DeWulf as Mrs. Lewis
 Miles McKenna as Justin
 Alex Peavey as Seb

Guest

 Briana Lane as Psychic Cindy ("Tarot Cards")
 Jacob Davich as Guy ("Sink or Swim")

Episodes

Production

Development
On August 24, 2017, it was announced that Hulu had given the production a series order for a first season consisting of ten half-hour episodes. The series was created by Jason Ubaldi who is set to executive produce alongside Brian Dannelly, Shelley Zimmerman, Jordan Levin, Brett Bouttier, and Joe Davola. The series marks Hulu's second collaboration with AwesomenessTV after the 2016 series, Freakish. On April 22, 2018, it was announced that the series would premiere on May 11, 2018.

Casting
Alongside the initial series announcement, it was confirmed that show's large ensemble cast would include Chris Avila, Brec Bassinger, Chanel Celaya, Ty Doran, Teala Dunn, Allie Grant, Caleb Ray, Eva Gutowski, Tetona Jackson, Gus Kamp, Tom Maden, Jenn McAllister, Austin North, Tequan Richmond, Chester Rushing, Jake Short, Chance Sutton, Noureen DeWulf, Kate Flannery, and Dawan Owens.

Release

Marketing
On April 11, 2018, the first teaser trailer for the series was released. On May 4, 2018, the official trailer was released.

Premiere
On May 10, 2018, the series held its official premiere at Awesomeness HQ in Los Angeles, California.

Reception
In a mixed review,  Robert Lloyd of the Los Angeles Times said, "Too long by half, awkward and obvious but not unlikable, the series is a cocktail mixed from stock characters and situations and whatever could be found in the folks' liquor cabinet the weekend they were away. You are free to interpret its allusiveness as intentional homage or as copying off one's neighbor's work. And of course, there is a portion of the hoped-for audience that will not be familiar with the many things that this is like, and a portion that will greet its familiar elements like old beloved friends." In another mixed review, Deciders Lea Palmieri recommended that viewers "skip" the series saying, "It might be hard to place yourself back in a time where the summer before you head off to college was the biggest hurdle in the world, and while it's not a frivolous concern for many, it's not quite enough of a hook to draw you in or make you care about the stakes at play, considering, you know, all the other stuff going on in 2018. In that sense, it is a fun escape viewing that doesn't really run the risk of making you feel overly emotionally attached to anyone or anything taking place."

References

External links

2010s American high school television series
2010s American teen sitcoms
2018 American television series debuts
2018 American television series endings
English-language television shows
Awesomeness (company)
Hulu original programming
Television series about teenagers